The Congo tetra (Phenacogrammus interruptus) is a species of fish in the African tetra family, found in the central Congo River Basin in Africa. It is commonly kept in aquaria.

Description 

The Congo tetra has a typical full-bodied tetra shape with rather large scales. When mature, the iridescent colors of the Congo tetra run through the fish from front to back, starting with blue on top changing to red through the middle, to yellow-gold, and back to blue just above the belly. It is not its fluorescent colors that make this tetra so distinct, but rather its tail fin, which develops into a grayish-violet feathery appendage with white edges. The males get up to 3.0 inches (8.5 cm). Females up to 2.75 inches (6 cm). The male is larger with more color, also the tail fin and dorsal fin are more extended. They also have different colors and extensions in the caudal fin.

Aquarium trade and keeping

Congo tetra are a popular aquarium species. However, their large size and active behavior makes them unsuited for most smaller tanks. They easily adapt to captive diets like pellets and frozen foods, though they will still hunt down live foods when offered. They have successfully been bred in captivity and captive bred individuals are commonly available. Whilst they can be kept healthy on a slightly wider range of water parameters, breeding often requires water parameters more similar to their natural habitat. Bad water quality has been known to affect male fin development and lead to loss of coloration.

Conservation status
The IUCN lists the Congo tetra as a species of Least Concern.

See also
List of freshwater aquarium fish species

Sources 
Ultrastructural Examination of Spermiogenesis and Spermatozoon Ultrastructure in Congo tetra Phenacogrammus interruptus Boulenger, 1899 (Ostariophysi: Characiformes: Alestidae)
Author: Pecio, Anna
Folia Biologica, Volume 57, Numbers 1–2, December 2008, pp. 13–21(9)
Publisher: Institute of Systematics and Evolution of Animals, Polish Academy of Sciences
IUCN Red list

References

External links
 
 Fishbase
 Congo Tetra Fact Sheet

Tetras
Freshwater fish of Africa
Fish described in 1899
Taxa named by George Albert Boulenger